Deni Taveras (born December 13, 1972) is an Dominican American politician who is a member of the Maryland House of Delegates for District 47B in Prince George's County, Maryland. She was previously a member of the Prince George's County Council, representing District 2 from 2014 to 2022.

Early life and education
Taveras was born in New York City in December 13, 1972. When Taveras was only four years old, her mother, Filomena Garcia, committed suicide. She moved between family members in New York and the Dominican Republic before settling with her father, Bienvenido Taveras. Taveras' father was killed while he was driving his taxi cab when she was eight years old. After this, she was placed under the care of her maternal grandmother in the neighborhood of Harlem.

Taveras attended Barnard College, where she earned a B.A. in chemistry in 1995, the University of Utah, where she earned a M.S. in chemistry in 1998, and the Woodrow Wilson School of Public and International Affairs at Princeton University, where she earned a M.P.A. degree in public affairs and urban regional planning in 2003.

Taveras moved to Maryland after receiving a job offer from the Dominican American National Roundtable in Washington, D.C.. Taveras became unemployed when the Great Recession hit. At the same time, the condominium complex she lived in was going bankrupt, and Taveras assumed leadership of the condo association.

Political involvement
After earning her master's degree, Taveras worked for the United States Environmental Protection Agency. Her concern for environmental issues prompted her to lead efforts to ban both fracking and styrofoam in her county. She became involved with Dominicans 2000, a group of Dominicans seeking to make community change through political action.

From 2011 to 2013, Taveras worked as the chief of staff for state senator Victor R. Ramirez.

Taveras made her first run for public office in 2014 for the Prince George's County Council in District 2, seeking to succeed councilmember Will Campos, who ran for the Maryland House of Delegates in District 47B. During her primary campaign, Taveras sought to win over Hispanic voters and received endorsements from Campos, County Executive Rushern Baker, and state delegate Joseline Peña-Melnyk. She won the Democratic primary in June 2014, edging out state delegate Doyle Niemann by six votes. After the ballots were counted, Neimann requested a recount but it did not change the vote difference. Taveras was unopposed in the general election.

Prince George's County Council

Taveras was sworn into the Prince George's County Council on December 1, 2014, making her the first Latina elected to the council. She was re-elected in 2018 after narrowly winning the Democratic primary against Hyattsville mayor Candace Hollingsworth. In December 2020, the council voted to elect Taveras to serve as its vice chair.

In September 2021, Taveras, termed out of running for a third term on the Prince George's County Council, announced that she would for the Maryland House of Delegates in District 47B in 2022. She won the Democratic primary on July 19, 2022, receiving 52.6 percent of the vote in the Democratic primary election.

In the legislature
Taveras was sworn into the Maryland House of Delegates on January 11, 2023. She is a member of the House Health and Government Operations Committee.

Political positions

Development initiatives
In October 2018, Taveras voted against overriding County Executive Rushern Baker's veto on a bill that would waive a school facilities surcharge for certain residential developers.

Housing
In 2016, Taveras introduced legislation that would hold landlords and property managers accountable for sex trafficking at their rental properties. The bill passed the county council unanimously and was signed into law by County Executive Baker.

In September 2020, Taveras introduced the "Fair Housing Act", a bill to strengthen the county's code enforcement to improve the quality of housing.

Immigration
In 2019, Taveras voted in favor of legislation that would block all county agencies from engaging in immigration enforcement.

Policing
In 2019, Taveras introduced legislation introduced legislation that would require all police officers to wear body cameras. Following the killing of William Green, a handicuffed man, by police officer Michael Owen Jr. in January 2020, Taveras reintroduced the bill.

Social issues
In 2015, Taveras was one of two county councilmembers to vote in favor of a proposal to provide paid sick leave to workers in Prince George's County.

In 2018, Taveras voted in favor of legislation that would establish a public financing program for local candidates by 2026.

Statewide and national politics
Taveras endorsed Hillary Clinton for president on November 17, 2015.

In 2021, Taveras endorsed state delegate Brooke Lierman for Comptroller of Maryland. She initially endorsed former Prince George's County Executive Rushern Baker for Governor of Maryland, but later endorsed author and former nonprofit CEO Wes Moore after Baker suspended his campaign.

Transportation
Taveras expressed concern over the construction of the Purple Line in her district, saying "I don't want to lose the vibrancy and the diversity that we currently have in our community. That is what makes us who we are in Langley Park and gives us the rich vibrancy that we have." Despite her concerns, she acknowledged that this displacement was inevitable in the long run, even with all the potential benefits of the Purple Line. She also expressed skepticism over a plan to add toll lanes to the Capital Beltway and Interstate 270 using public-private partnerships.

Personal life
Taveras lives in Adelphi, Maryland.

Electoral history

References

1972 births
21st-century American politicians
21st-century American women politicians
African-American women in politics
American people of Dominican Republic descent
American politicians of Dominican Republic descent
Barnard College alumni
Democratic Party members of the Maryland House of Delegates
Living people
Hispanic and Latino American politicians
Hispanic and Latino American state legislators in Maryland
People from New York City
Princeton School of Public and International Affairs alumni
University of Utah alumni
Women state legislators in Maryland
County commissioners in Maryland